Trichopsomyia recedens, the shadowy psyllid-killer, is a species of syrphid fly observed in widespread locations in North Americax. Hoverflies can remain nearly motionless in flight. The adults are also known as flower flies for they are commonly found on flowers, from which they get both energy-giving nectar and protein-rich pollen. Larvae when known are psyllid, aphid and Phylloxera predators.

References

Pipizinae
Hoverflies of North America
Insects described in 1852
Taxa named by Francis Walker (entomologist)